Nicolson Calvert (15 May 1764 – 13 April 1841) was an English Whig politician.

Life
The son of Felix Calvert, a brewer from Southwark and Hunsdon, he was educated at Harrow School and at Trinity Hall, Cambridge.
In 1789 he married Frances Pery, daughter and co-heir of the 1st Viscount Pery, a powerful politician from Limerick in Ireland. They had six sons and two daughters. Their son, Felix (d. 1862), fought at the Battle of Waterloo while their second daughter Isabella (1793–1862) married Sir James Stronge, Bt. They lived at Hunsdon House in Hertfordshire, which he inherited from his uncle (also named Nicolson Calvert). His granddaughter Flora Louisa Calvert married Lt Col. Alfred Tippinge, and his great granddaughter Helena was the wife of Arthur Irwin Dasent.

Career
He was a Member of Parliament (MP) for the borough of Hertford from 1802 to 1826, and for the county of Hertfordshire from 1826 to 1834. He commanded the Eastern Battalion, Hertfordshire Local Militia, when it was raised at Hertford in 1808.

References 

1764 births
1841 deaths
People educated at Harrow School
Alumni of Trinity Hall, Cambridge
Hertfordshire Militia officers
Whig (British political party) MPs for English constituencies
Members of the Parliament of the United Kingdom for Hertfordshire
UK MPs 1802–1806
UK MPs 1806–1807
UK MPs 1807–1812
UK MPs 1812–1818
UK MPs 1818–1820
UK MPs 1820–1826
UK MPs 1826–1830
UK MPs 1830–1831
UK MPs 1831–1832
UK MPs 1832–1835